F1E or variant, may refer to:

Aerospace
 North American F-1E Fury, a U.S. fighter plane
 Dassault Mirage F1E, a French fighter plane from Dassault, variant of the Mirage F1
 Falcon 1e (F1e), a proposed space launch rocket from SpaceX, a variant of the Falcon 1
 F1E, a competition sports class of flying model aircraft; see Free flight (model aircraft)

Other uses
 Apricot Computers F1e, a personal computer
 F1e, a subgroup of Haplogroup F (mtDNA)

See also

 F1 (disambiguation)
 E1F vacuum tube, an acorn tube 
 FLE (disambiguation) and "fle", "Fle"
 FIE (disambiguation)